John and Wilhelmina Helm House is a historic home located at Washington, Franklin County, Missouri. It was built about 1868, and is a one-story, five bay, double entrance brick dwelling on a brick foundation.  It has a side-gable roof and straight topped door and window openings.  It was originally a three bay, side entry facade, and had two more bays added sometime after 1869.

It was listed on the National Register of Historic Places in 2000.

References

Houses on the National Register of Historic Places in Missouri
Houses completed in 1868
Buildings and structures in Franklin County, Missouri
National Register of Historic Places in Franklin County, Missouri
1868 establishments in Missouri